Tracy Austin was the defending champion, but lost in semifinals to Chris Evert Lloyd with a double bagel.

Martina Navratilova won the title by defeating Chris Evert Lloyd 4–6, 6–1, 6–2 in the final.

Seeds
All seeds received a bye to the quarterfinals.

Draw

Draw

References

External links
 Official results archive (ITF)

1982 WTA Tour